The Trade and Development Bank (TDB) of Mongolia (Mongolian: Худалдаа Хөгжлийн Банк, Khudaldaa Khögzhliĭn Bank) is a commercial bank located in Ulaanbaatar. It is the oldest, as well as one of the largest banks in Mongolia. It was founded in October 1990 and currently has a total of 97 branches throughout the country.

The Trade and Development Bank of Mongolia LLC is a Mongolian domiciled limited liability company first permitted to conduct banking activities on May 29, 1993. Its current banking license was renewed on February 27, 2002.

References

Banks of Mongolia
Companies based in Ulaanbaatar